Ashutosh Deb (1803—1856) commonly known as A. T. Deb was an Indian lexicographer, publisher and musician. He was the producer of an early Bengali dictionary. He was also a sitar player and composed many popular tappa and other songs. Deb was also a Hindu priest as well as notable academician of Bengal. He started his career as a publisher and uplifted his father's publishing company BMR. Deb founded Deb Sahitya Kutir publishing house in Kolkata, a famous publications for children literature.

References

1803 births
1856 deaths
Indian male musicians
Musicians from Kolkata
19th-century Indian musicians
19th-century male musicians
Indian lexicographers
Bengali Hindus